My Kingdom may refer to:

 My Kingdom (song), a single by Future Sound of London
 My Kingdom (film), a 2001 British crime film
 My Kingdom (Scrubs), an episode of Scrubs
 My Kingdom (Webtoon)